Heart of America is a charity single written by Tim Blixseth, and "two music-industry professionals". The song became the anthem for the Today TV show's  "Make a Difference" campaign to benefit the victims of 2005s Hurricane Katrina. In 2005 Blixseth and Crocker appeared on the show to talk about the song. According to Blixseth it was written in the middle of the night after he awoke from a dream. The song was recorded by Wynonna Judd, Michael McDonald, Terry Dexter and Eric Benet. It was played on NBC as part of a Habitat for Humanity campaign.

In June 2006, Ebony magazine reported the song had raised $41 million with projected revenues of $100 million. In August 2006  The Desert Sun reported the song had generated $127 million in revenues for hurricane-relief charities. All of the revenues from the song were for the benefit of Habitat for Humanity, Music Cares and the American Red Cross.

References 

Hurricane Katrina disaster relief charity singles